Edmund Goodman (born 8 October 1873 in Birmingham UK – died 1960) was an English football manager. He had his playing career at Aston Villa cut short by an injury, sustained playing for the reserves, which meant he had to have his leg amputated. After this he became assistant secretary at Villa. When Crystal Palace F.C. were formed as a professional outfit in 1905, they asked Villa for help in setting up the club. The West Midlands club offered Goodman to Palace and he helped to appoint their first manager and also chairman. After two seasons he took over as manager and remained so for 18 years, becoming Palace's longest serving manager in the process.

Under Goodman's management Palace were the runners up in the Southern League in 1914, behind Swindon Town, on goal-average, and won the inaugural Football League Third Division title in 1920–21. Palace were relegated from the Second Division in 1925 and in November that year Goodman resigned and reverted to his original position of club secretary. He retired in 1933 and subsequently ran a grocery shop in nearby Anerley, South London.

References

1873 births
1960 deaths
Aston Villa F.C. players
Crystal Palace F.C. managers
English amputees
English football managers
Footballers from Birmingham, West Midlands
Association footballers not categorized by position
English footballers